Mahatma Gandhi Mission Medical College and Hospital  is located in Navi Mumbai, Maharashtra, India. It was established in 1989 and granted Deemed University status in 2006.

Notable Alumni 
Neha Rajpal

Varshil Mehta

References

External links

2006 establishments in Maharashtra
Universities and colleges in Maharashtra
Medical colleges in Maharashtra
Affiliates of Maharashtra University of Health Sciences